The Korringa–Kohn–Rostoker (KKR) method is used to calculate the electronic band structure of periodic solids. In the derivation of the method using multiple scattering theory by Jan Korringa and the derivation based on the Kohn and Rostoker variational method, the muffin-tin approximation was used. Later calculations are done with full potentials having no shape restrictions.

Introduction
All solids in their ideal state are single crystals with the atoms arranged on a periodic lattice. In condensed matter physics, the properties of such solids are explained on the basis of their electronic structure. This requires the solution of a complicated many-electron problem, but the density functional theory of Walter Kohn makes it possible to reduce it to the solution of a Schroedinger equation with a one-electron periodic potential. The problem is further simplified with the use of group theory and in particular Bloch's theorem, which leads to the result that the energy eigenvalues depend on the crystal momentum  and are divided into bands. Band theory is used to calculate the eigenvalues and wave functions.

As compared with other band structure methods, the Korringa-Kohn-Rostoker (KKR) band structure method has the advantage of dealing with small matrices due to the fast convergence of scattering operators in angular momentum space, and disordered systems where it allows to carry out with relative ease the ensemble configuration averages. The KKR method does have a few “bills” to pay, e.g., (1) the calculation of KKR structure constants, the empty lattice propagators, must be carried out by the Ewald’s sums for each energy and k-point, and (2) the KKR functions have a pole structure on the real energy axis, which requires a much larger number of k points for the Brillouin Zone (BZ) integration as compared with other band theory methods. The KKR method has been implemented in several codes for electronic structure and spectroscopy calculations, such as MuST, AkaiKKR, sprKKR, FEFF, GNXAS and JuKKR.

Mathematical formulation
The KKR band theory equations for space-filling non-spherical potentials are derived in books and in the article on multiple scattering theory.

The wave function near site  is determined by the coefficients .  According to Bloch's theorem, these coefficients differ only through a phase factor . The  satisfy the homogeneous equations 

The  is the inverse of the scattering matrix  calculated with the non-spherical potential for the site. As pointed out by Korringa, Ewald derived a summation process that makes it possible to calculate the structure constants, .

In the original derivations of the KKR method, spherically symmetric muffin-tin potentials were used. Such potentials have the advantage that the inverse of the scattering matrix is diagonal in 

where  is the scattering phase shift that appears in the partial wave analysis in scattering theory. The muffin-tin approximation is good for closely packed metals, but it does not work well for ionic solids like semiconductors. It also leads to errors in calculations of interatomic forces.

References

Electronic structure methods